Alberto Leoncini Bartoli (born  in Ancona) is a retired Italian diplomat.

Career 
In 1958 he joined the foreign service and was assigned first to the Economic Department and thereafter to the press service of the Ministry of Foreign Affairs. In 1960 he was appointed vice-consul in Berlin. From 1963 to 1967 he served first at the Italian Embassy in Vienna and thereafter in Sofia. From 1968 to 1971 he was appointed to the Press Service department in Rome. From 1972 to 1976 he was appointed councilor to the Italian Embassy in Bonn. From 1977 to 1980 he headed first the Comecon and thereafter the North Atlantic Council departments in Rome. In 1979 he was promoted Envoy Extraordinary and Minister Plenipotentiary. In 1981, he was appointed Minister Plenipotentiary  to the Italian Embassy in Paris where in 1986 he was promoted first class special envoy and plenipotentiary. From July 1987 to 1990 he was appointed ambassador to Tel Aviv. From 1993 to 1996 he was appointed ambassador to Cairo. From 1996 to 1997 he was appointed chief of protocol of the Ministry of Foreign Affairs. From 1997 to 1999 he was appointed ambassador to the Holy See. From 1999 to 2000 he was appointed Secretary General for Internal Affairs of the Sovereign Military Order of Malta. From 2001 to 2016 he was appointed Ambassador of the Sovereign Military Order of Malta to the Holy See.

See also 
 Ministry of Foreign Affairs (Italy)
 Foreign relations of Italy

References

Ambassadors of Italy to Israel
Ambassadors of Italy to Egypt
Italian diplomats
20th-century diplomats
1932 births
Living people
Italian expatriates in Germany
Sapienza University of Rome alumni
Italian expatriates in Israel
Italian expatriates in France
Italian expatriates in Egypt